The II Grote Prijs van Danske (or 2nd Danish Grand Prix) was held on 26–27 August 1961,  at the Roskilde Ring circuit, Roskilde, Denmark. The race was a non-Championship event run for cars complying with Formula One rules. The race was run over three heats, one of 20 laps and two of 30 laps, and was won overall by Stirling Moss, who won all three heats in his Lotus 18/21.

This was the first Formula One event to be held at the Roskildering, which was eventually closed in 1969. The first heat was held on the 26 August, a Saturday, with the final two heats on the Sunday.

Race summary
The first heat saw Moss win by two tenths of a second from Australian Jack Brabham, with Innes Ireland in third. Moss also took the second heat, with Ireland in second this time, and Roy Salvadori in third, with Brabham retiring with gearbox failure. Jim Clark retired from the second heat but returned for the third. The first three home in the second heat crossed the line in the same order in the third heat, with an easy overall win for Moss, who, having claimed pole at the beginning of the proceedings, also drove the fastest lap in all three heats.

Overall results

References

External links
Full results details at formula2.net

Danish Grand Prix
Danish Grand Prix
Grand Prix
1961 in Danish motorsport